Isaiah Ju'mar Jackson (born January 10, 2002) is an American basketball player for the Indiana Pacers of the National Basketball Association (NBA). He played college basketball for the Kentucky Wildcats.

High school career
As a freshman, Jackson played basketball for Lutheran Northwest High School in Rochester Hills, Michigan. He moved to Old Redford Academy in Detroit for his sophomore season. As a junior, Jackson competed for SPIRE Academy in Geneva, Ohio alongside LaMelo Ball and his Old Redford teammate Rocket Watts. He averaged 14.9 points and 10.4 rebounds per game. For his senior season, he transferred to Waterford Mott High School in Waterford, Michigan. Jackson averaged 19.1 points, 13 rebounds and 7.7 blocks per game as a senior. He was named to the Jordan Brand Classic roster.

Recruiting
Considered a five-star recruit by Rivals, Jackson committed to playing college basketball for Kentucky over offers from Alabama and Syracuse.

College career
On December 1, 2020, Jackson recorded seven points, 12 rebounds and a career-high eight blocks in a 65–62 loss to seventh-ranked Kansas at the Champions Classic. He had the most single-game blocks by a Kentucky player since Willie Cauley-Stein in 2013. As a freshman, Jackson averaged 8.4 points, 6.6 rebounds and an SEC-high 2.6 blocks per game, earning SEC All-Defensive and All-Freshman Team honors. On March 17, 2021, he declared for the 2021 NBA draft while maintaining his college eligibility. He later signed with an agent, forgoing his remaining eligibility.

Professional career

Indiana Pacers (2021–present) 
Jackson was selected with the 22nd pick of the 2021 NBA draft by the Los Angeles Lakers and then traded to the Indiana Pacers. On October 23, he made his NBA debut, scoring one point in two minutes of action during a 102–91 overtime win over the Miami Heat. On January 31, 2022, Jackson logged a career-high 26 points, alongside ten rebounds and two blocks, in a 122–116 win over the Los Angeles Clippers.

Career statistics

NBA

|-
| style="text-align:left;"| 2021–22
| style="text-align:left;"| Indiana
| 36 || 15 || 15.0 || .563 || .313 || .682 || 4.1 || .3 || .7 || 1.4 || 8.3
|- class="sortbottom"
| style="text-align:center;" colspan="2"|Career
| 36 || 15 || 15.0 || .563 || .313 || .682 || 4.1 || .3 || .7 || 1.4 || 8.3

College

|-
| style="text-align:left;"| 2020–21
| style="text-align:left;"| Kentucky
| 25 || 18 || 20.8 || .540 || .000 || .700 || 6.6 || .7 || .8 || 2.6 || 8.4

References

External links

Kentucky Wildcats bio
USA Basketball bio

2002 births
Living people
American men's basketball players
Basketball players from Michigan
Fort Wayne Mad Ants players
Indiana Pacers players
Kentucky Wildcats men's basketball players
Los Angeles Lakers draft picks
Power forwards (basketball)
Sportspeople from Pontiac, Michigan